Guillermo Feliú Cruz (1900-1973) was a Chilean historian, bibliographer and librarian. He learned historical method by José Toribio Medina who later successfully proposed Feliú Cruz as curator of Biblioteca Americana in the Biblioteca Nacional de Chile.

References

1900 births
1973 deaths
Cruz Family
20th-century Chilean historians
20th-century Chilean male writers
Chilean librarians
Chilean curators
Chilean bibliographers
People from Talca
Instituto Nacional General José Miguel Carrera alumni